"Soldier" is a song by Neil Young from the 1972 soundtrack album, Journey Through the Past. It was the only new track included on the album, and was later released on the 1977 compilation Decade, although it was slightly edited.

The song observes how a soldier's eyes "shine like the sun." In the second verse, Young sings he does not believe Jesus because he "can't deliver right away".

According the Neil Young Archives Vol. 1 book (1945-1972), this recording is Neil solo on piano and vocal, recorded by L.A. Johnson inside a sawdust burner in a sawmill, Kings Mountain, California on November 18, 1971. According to Neil Young's notes from the Decade 3-Record set(1977), the sounds in the background are of a roaring fire. This song is published by Silver Fiddle/BMI.

References

Songs about soldiers
Songs about the military
Neil Young songs
1972 songs
Songs written by Neil Young